Darko Ronald Suvin (born Darko Šlesinger) is a Yugoslav-born academic, writer and critic who became a professor (now emeritus) at McGill University in Montreal. He was born in Zagreb, which at the time was in Kingdom of Yugoslavia, now  the capital of Croatia. After teaching at the Department for Comparative Literature at the Zagreb University, and writing his first books and poems in his native language (i.e., in the standardized Croatian variety of Serbo-Croatian), he left Yugoslavia in 1967, and started teaching at McGill University in 1968.

He is best known for several major works of criticism and literary history devoted to science fiction. He was editor of Science-Fiction Studies (later respelled as Science Fiction Studies) from 1973 to 1980. Since his retirement from McGill in 1999, he has lived in Lucca, Italy. He is a Fellow of the Royal Society of Canada (Academy of Humanities and Social Sciences).

In 2009, he received Croatian SFera Award for lifetime achievement in science fiction. He is also a member of the Croatian Writers Society (HDP).

In 2016, Suvin published a series of memoirs in the Croatian cultural journal Gordogan on his youth as a member of the Young Communist League of Yugoslavia during the Nazi occupation of Croatia and Yugoslavia and the first years of Josip Tito's Yugoslavia. His 2016 book Splendour, Misery, and Potentialities: An X-ray of Socialist Yugoslavia (published in translation as Samo jednom se ljubi: radiografija SFR Jugoslavije in Belgrade in 2014, in two printings), an attempt at a dialectical history of socialist Yugoslavia, is widely quoted in most recent books and articles in the emerging field of "post-Yugoslav studies".

Biography

Early life

Suvin was born in Zagreb, Kingdom of Yugoslavia, on July 19, 1930 to a Croatian Jewish family of Miroslav and Truda (née Weiser) Šlesinger. In Zagreb he attended the Jewish elementary school in Palmotićeva street. In 1939 his family changed the surname from Šlesinger to Suvin due to political situation and antisemitism caused by Nazi propaganda. When Suvin was a young child, there was great political strife in Yugoslavia. Originally a monarchy, Yugoslavia quickly succumbed to the Fascist occupation, and then later various other types of government. In the early 1940s, before the end of World War Two, a Nazi controlled bomb exploded close to Suvin, an event that was ultimately responsible for piquing his interest in science fiction, not because of the technology behind the bomb, but because he realized in even a slightly alternative world, he might have been killed right then and there. Many members of his family perished during the Holocaust, including his paternal grandparents Lavoslav and Josipa Šlesinger.

Interest in literature

After World War Two, Suvin became even more interested in science fiction. He earned his PhD from Zagreb University. Soon after, he published his first article, which was little more than a brief overview and survey of the SF genre. He continued to earn a living by translating a wide variety of science fiction books into his native language. They included The Seedling Stars and Day of the Triffids. In general, the more fascinating he found a book, the more likely he was to translate it.

In Yugoslavia during the early 1960s, Suvin published his first book, a historical introduction to, or general overview of, science fiction as a whole. The works of Asimov, Heinlein and others were discussed in great detail, and several individual SF books were analyzed. The book also included the results of his first article initially published in 1957.

Move to North America

In 1967, Suvin emigrated to North America to teach in universities. Shortly after arriving, college students in the United States were revolting. Students wanted many things, but among them were more courses, one of which was science fiction. At this point, Suvin's expertise was extremely desirable, and there were many educational institutions that were looking to hire him.

Suvin was hired as a science fiction professor at McGill University in Montreal in 1968. About five years later, the number of students signing up for SF courses dropped significantly, leaving him to teach English and literature courses. Through his teaching career, he has published numerous works and contributed to the study of science fiction. In 1999, Suvin retired and moved to Italy, where he lives to this day.

Awards
 The SFera Award for lifetime achievement in science fiction, 2009.

 The Lyman Tower Sargent Distinguished Scholar Award by the North American Society for Utopian Studies, 2013.

 A Distinguished Service Award by the European Utopian Studies Society, 2019.

Philosophy

Science fiction

Works of science fiction all begin with the idea of framing a hypothesis - a new thing or novum. The most common of these hypotheses is likely time travel, although there are many thousands of distinct alternate realities used in books and movies that do not utilize time travel as a hypothesis. It is Suvin's opinion that some of the most commercially successful works of SF have only used this idea of framing a hypothesis as an ornament. In other words, Suvin believes that the most popular mainstream SF works, like Star Wars, are not truly SF at heart—they simply utilize the genre as a way to take advantage of the special effects and uniqueness that go along with the genre.

Cognitive estrangement

In Suvin's opinion, the focus of the genre lies in encouraging new ways of thinking about human society, or to inspire those who are oppressed to resist. Suvin has labeled this idea of subversive thinking as cognitive estrangement. Those works of SF that could be characterized as using cognitive estrangement rely on no one particular hypothesis, but instead on the cognitive presentation of alternative realities that directly contradict the status quo.

Bibliography

Works

Dva vida dramaturgije: eseji o teatarskoj viziji (Zagreb 1964) — "Two aspects of dramaturgy: essays on theatrical vision", in Croatian
Od Lukijana do Lunjika (Zagreb 1965) — "From Lucian to Lunik", in Croatian, anthology and theory of science fiction. Major parts of this book and other early essays, published in the 1960s in Croatian, were later reworked for Metamorphoses of Science Fiction.
Other Worlds, Other Seas: Science Fiction Stories From Socialist Countries, selected and edited with Preface and notes, New York: Random House, 1970; New York - Berkeley, 1972; German edition 1972 and 1975; French 1973; Dutch 1976; Japanese 1976, Spanish 1981)
Uvod u Brechta (Zagreb 1970) — "Introduction into Brecht", in Croatian
Russian Science Fiction, 1956–1970: A Bibliography (1971) and later editions
Science-Fiction Studies: Selected Articles on Science Fiction, 1973–1975 (1976) —  editor with R. D. Mullen
Dramatika Iva Vojnovića: geneza i struktura (Dubrovnik, Vol. 20, 1977, issue 5-6) — "Ivo Vojnovic's Dramatics: Genesis and Structure", the whole issue of the magazine printed Suvin's PhD from University of Zagreb; often wrongly cited as the book
H. G. Wells and Modern Science Fiction (1977) — edited by Darko Suvin, with Robert M. Philmus
Science-Fiction Studies: Selected Articles on Science Fiction, 1976–1977 (1978) —  editor with R. D. Mullen
Metamorphoses of Science Fiction: On the Poetics and History of a Literary Genre (Yale University Press, 1979) (also French version 1977; German 1979; Spanish 1984 and 1987; Italian 1985; Japanese 1991; Croatian 2010; Chinese 2011).
Victorian Science Fiction in the UK: The Discourses of Knowledge and of Power (1983)
To Brecht and Beyond: Soundings in Modern Dramaturgy (1984)
The Long March, Notes on the Way 1981–1984, Poems (1987)
Positions and Presuppositions in Science Fiction (1988) 
Armirana Arkadija (Zagreb 1990) — poems in Croatian
Lessons of Japan: Assayings of Some Intercultural Stances (1997)
Learning from Other Worlds: Estrangement, Cognition, and the Politics of Science Fiction and Utopia (Liverpool University Press, 2001) - edited by Patrick Parrinder, collection of essays on science fiction and utopian literature honouring the work of Darko Suvin, with Suvin's full and detailed bibliography in all languages
US Science Fiction and War/Militarism (Fictions, Studi sulla narrativita, Anno III, Pisa 2004, issue 3: 1-166) — guest editor, with Salvatore Proietti, special issue in English
Gdje smo? Kuda idemo? Za političku epistemologiju spasa: eseji za orijentaciju i djelovanje u oskudnom vremenu (Zagreb 2006) — "Where are we? What are we getting to? For a political epistemology of salvation: essays for the orientation and doing in time of needs", in Croatian (translated from English manuscript with author's supervision)
"Of Starship Troopers and Refuseniks: War and Militarism in US Science Fiction", Part 2 ("1975–2001: Post-Fordism, and Some Conclusions") printed in Extrapolation, 48.1 (2007): 9-34; Part 1 ("1945–1974: Fordism"), in D.M. Hassler and C. Wilcox (eds.), New Boundaries in Political Science Fiction, University of South Carolina Press, 2008, 115-144; integrally printed (in Croatian, authorised translation from the manuscript) in Ubiq, Zagreb 2009, No. 5
"Spoznaja, sloboda, The Dispossessed kao klasik" (In: Ubiq, Zagreb 2008, No. 2) — "Cognition, Freedom, The Dispossessed as a Classic"; major work on Ursula K. Le Guin's novel, in Croatian translation with author's supervision, English version partially printed in Paradoxa (2008, No. 21, Ursula K. Le Guin Issue)
Naučna fantastika, spoznaja, sloboda (Belgrade 2009) — "Science fiction, cognition, freedom", in Croatian and Serbian, selected essays on science fiction translated from English manuscripts or printed in Croatian, from 1960s to 2000s; selection from Yugoslav, Croatian and Serbian journals
Defined by a Hollow: Essays on Utopia, Science Fiction and Political Epistemology (Peter Lang, 2010) — preface by Phillip Wegner
Kje smo? Kam gremo? Za politično ekonomijo odrešitve (Ljubljana: Založba Sophia, 2010) — "Where are we? What are we getting to?" in Slovene translation
Darko Suvin, a Life in Letters (Washington 2011) — edited by Phillip E. Wegner, Paradoxa, No. 23, selected writings and poems
Preživjeti Potop: fantasy, po-robljenje i granična spoznaja (Ubiq, 2012) — "Surviving the Deluge: fantasy, commodification and liminal cognition", in Croatian, the book collects Suvin's recent writings on fantasy
In Leviathan's Belly: Essays for a Counter-Revolutionary Time (Borgo Press, 2012) — essays
Samo jednom se ljubi: radiografija SFR Jugoslavije (Rosa Luxemburg Stiftung South East Europe, 2014) — "You Love Only Once. Radiography of SFR Yugoslavia, 1945–1972", in Croatian, translated from English manuscript
Splendour, Misery, and Potentialities: An X-ray of Socialist Yugoslavia, foreword Fredric Jameson, Brill, 2016. [Original of above book, slightly amplified]
Brechtovo ustvarjanje in horizont komunizma - "Brecht’s Works and the Horizon of Communism", Slovene edition of essays on Bertold Brecht, Ljubljana: MLG, 2016
Metamorphoses of Science Fiction: On the Poetics and History of a Literary Genre, Ralahine Classic, expanded edition, ed. Gerry Canavan. Peter Lang, 2016

References

Citations

1934 births
Living people
Croatian Jews
University of Zagreb alumni
Academic staff of the University of Zagreb
Croatian literary critics
Canadian literary critics
Croatian speculative fiction critics
Canadian speculative fiction critics
Yugoslav emigrants to Canada
Science fiction critics
Utopian studies scholars